Ankenesstranda or Ankenesstrand (sometimes simply called "Ankenes") is a village in Narvik Municipality in Nordland county, Norway.  The village is located just west of the town of Narvik and just east of the village of Håkvik. The village lies at the confluence of the large Ofotfjorden and the smaller Beisfjorden. The European route E06 highway runs through the village before crossing the Beisfjord Bridge into the town of Narvik.  In 2016, there were about 3,000 inhabitants of the village.

The village was the administrative centre of the former municipality of Ankenes which existed from 1884 until 1974. 

Ankenes Church is an octagonal church that was built in Ankenesstranda in 1842. Ankenes is also known for  Millerjordbukta (the local shopping area), and the local football team SK Hardhaus. The local Ankenes Skiing Resort (Ankenes Alpinsenter) was built in 1972 and it has 8 runs and 2 lifts.  In 1973, the Ankenes Alpine Club was also established.

References

Narvik
Villages in Nordland